Briaroaks is a city in Johnson County, Texas, United States. The population was 492 at the 2010 census.

Geography

Briaroaks is located in northern Johnson County at  (32.492470, –97.302234). It is bordered to the northeast by Burleson.

Demographics

As of the census of 2000, there were 493 people, 180 households, and 160 families residing in the city. The population density was 477.5 people per square mile (184.8/km2). There were 181 housing units at an average density of 175.3 per square mile (67.8/km2). The racial makeup of the city was 98.58% White, 1.01% from other races, and 0.41% from two or more races. Hispanic or Latino of any race were 2.64% of the population.

There were 180 households, out of which 28.3% had children under the age of 18 living with them, 81.1% were married couples living together, 5.0% had a female householder with no husband present, and 10.6% were non-families. 8.3% of all households were made up of individuals, and 5.0% had someone living alone who was 65 years of age or older. The average household size was 2.74 and the average family size was 2.89.

In the city, the population was spread out, with 22.1% under the age of 18, 5.1% from 18 to 24, 22.1% from 25 to 44, 35.5% from 45 to 64, and 15.2% who were 65 years of age or older. The median age was 45 years. For every 100 females, there were 98.0 males. For every 100 females age 18 and over, there were 100.0 males.

The median income for a household in the city was $60,938, and the median income for a family was $65,250. Males had a median income of $51,875 versus $30,750 for females. The per capita income for the city was $23,968. About 6.2% of families and 7.4% of the population were below the poverty line, including 10.2% of those under age 18 and 2.4% of those age 65 or over.

Education
Briaroaks is served by the Burleson Independent School District.

Climate
The climate in this area is characterized by hot, humid summers and generally mild to cool winters.  According to the Köppen Climate Classification system, Briaroaks has a humid subtropical climate, abbreviated "Cfa" on climate maps.

References

Dallas–Fort Worth metroplex
Cities in Texas
Cities in Johnson County, Texas